"The Execution of All Things" is the title track of Los Angeles-based indie rock band Rilo Kiley's second album. It was released as a single on September 22, 2003 via Saddle Creek. Rilo Kiley's cover of The Velvet Underground's "After Hours" appears as a b-side, as does a new track called "Emotional (Until Crickets Guide You Back)". The single and its b-sides are available to download on the iTunes Store.

Critical reception
Rolling Stone called the song "a checklist of modern destruction", praising Lewis' "girlish, ethereal voice that makes the band's brutal vision all the more startling."

Track listings and formats
7" vinyl and CD single
"The Execution of All Things"  – 4:10
"Emotional (Until Crickets Guide You Back)"  – 3:52
"After Hours"  – 2:57

Credits and personnel
Jenny Lewis – lead vocals
Blake Sennett – guitar 
Pierre De Reeder – bass guitar
Jason Boesel – drums
Mike Mogis – production, recording
A. J. Mogis – mixing
Doug Van Sloun – mastering
Andy Ward – artwork
Jadon Ulrich – artwork layout

References

2003 singles
Rilo Kiley songs
2002 songs
Saddle Creek Records singles